Basant Kushwaha also known as Basant Kumar was an Indian politician and a Member of Bihar Legislative Assembly from the Harlakhi Assembly constituency, Madhubani. He was a leader of Rashtriya Lok Samata Party (RLSP). Kushwaha contested and won the assembly elections in 2015, as a candidate of RLSP, but before taking oath as the member of assembly, he died due to a cardiac attack. In the by-polls conducted after one year, in 2016, his son, Sudhansu Shekhar won the constituency for the first time.

References

Rashtriya Lok Samata politicians
Bihar MLAs 2015–2020
Year of birth missing
Place of birth missing
Year of death missing
Place of death missing
2015 deaths